Hüseyn Məhəmmədov (born 22 August 1974) is a retired Azerbaijani football player. During his career he won the Azerbaijan Premier League seven times and the Azerbaijan Cup four times. He also played for Azerbaijan national team.

Career statistics

Honours
Turan Tovuz
Azerbaijan Premier League: 1993–94
Gäncä
Azerbaijan Premier League: 1997–98, 1998–99
Azerbaijan Cup: 1996–97, 1997–98, 1999-00
Shamkir
Azerbaijan Premier League: 2000–01, 2001–02
Neftchi Baku
Azerbaijan Premier League: 2003–04, 2004–05
Azerbaijan Cup: 2003-04

National team statistics

References

1974 births
Living people
Azerbaijani footballers
Azerbaijan international footballers
Azerbaijani expatriate footballers
People from Tovuz
Association football goalkeepers